Sodium sulfite (sodium sulphite) is the inorganic compound with the chemical formula Na2SO3. A white, water-soluble solid, it is used commercially as an antioxidant and preservative.  A heptahydrate is also known but it is less useful because of its greater susceptibility toward oxidation by air.

Preparation
Sodium sulfite can be prepared by treating a solution of sodium hydroxide with sulfur dioxide.  When conducted in warm water, Na2SO3 initially precipitates as a white solid.  With more SO2, the solid dissolves to give the disulfite, which crystallizes upon cooling.  
SO2  +  2 NaOH  ->  Na2SO3  +  H2O

Sodium sulfite is made industrially by treating sulfur dioxide with a solution of sodium carbonate. The overall reaction is:
SO2  +   Na2CO3  ->  Na2SO3  +  CO2

Applications
Sodium sulfite is primarily used in the pulp and paper industry. It has been also applied in the thermomechanical conversion of wood to fibres (defibration) for producing medium density fibreboards (MDF).

As an oxygen scavenger agent, it is used to treat water being fed to steam boilers to avoid corrosion problems, in the photographic industry, it protects developer solutions from oxidation and (as hypo clear solution) to wash fixer (sodium thiosulfate) from film and photo-paper emulsions.

As a reducing agent it is used in the textile industry as a bleaching, desulfurizing, and dechlorinating agent (e.g. in swimming pools).  Its reducing properties are exploited in its use as a preservative to prevent dried fruit from discoloring, and for preserving meats.

It is used as a reagent in sulfonation and sulfomethylation agent. It is used in the production of sodium thiosulfate.

The Wellman–Lord process utilizes sodium sulfite for flue gas desulfurization

Reactions

Sodium sulfite is primarily used as a mild reducing agent.  The heptahydrate crystals effloresce in warm dry air.  Heptahydrate crystals also oxidize in air to form sodium sulfate. The anhydrous form is more resistant to oxidation by air.

Sodium bisulfite,  NaHSO3, is mixture of salts that dissolve in water to give solutions composed of sodium and bisulfite ions.

Structure
According to X-ray crystallography sodium sulfite heptahydrate features pyramidal SO32- centers.  The S-O distances are 1.50 and the O-S-O angles are near 106º.

References

Photographic chemicals
Sodium compounds
Sulfites
E-number additives